Bostanabad is a city in East Azerbaijan Province, Iran.

Bostanabad may also refer to:

Bostanabad, Kermanshah
Bostanabad, Qom
Bostanabad County, an administrative subdivision of East Azerbaijan Province, Iran

See also
 Bostan (disambiguation)